The Tale of the Priest and of His Workman Balda (Сказка о попе и о работнике его Балде) is an extant Soviet animated feature film directed by the husband-and-wife team Mikhail Tsekhanovsky and Vera Tsekhanovskaya and based on the 1830 eponymous fairy tale in verse by Alexander Pushkin. The score was composed by Dmitri Shostakovich. The only surviving episode (2 and half mins) is called Bazaar (Marketplace).

History
In 1932 the Leningrad animator and experimentator Mikhail Tsekhanovsky launched his most ambitious project to date: an animated opera based on the fairy tale in verse by the Russian classic Alexander Pushkin, yet with a heavy ROSTA posters influence. It was conceived as the first traditionally animated Soviet feature film that used the "album method" of animation, with characters drawn on paper instead of celluloid. The film was created at the Lenfilm animation studio headed by Tsekhanovsky and his wife who also served as the directors, leading artists and screenwriters.

In 1933 they contacted the young composer Dmitri Shostakovich and asked him to write music to accompany the film. They also invited an acclaimed poet Alexander Vvedensky shortly after his return from under arrest to write additional lyrics. Shostakovich loved the opportunity to compose an innovative satirical opera with abstract characters led by his music and not by someone else. He called it "a fairy tale full of ardor, ease and joy, and writing music for it is just as easy and joyful". As Tsekhanovsky wrote during September 1934, "...he works incredibly fast without losing quality. True artist. True craftsman. Now it's up to me. I must create something worth of his music. I must. Balda is the only project where I can show what I'm capable of". They recorded 15 scenes by November.

Yet problems started early into the production. Tsekhanovsky, still inexperienced, was always behind the composer, facing organizational and financial problems. The first attempts to close Balda date back to 1933. In March 1936, studio executives persuaded the composer to reorchestrate his score from a symphony to chamber orchestra. Around the same time the infamous Muddle Instead of Music article was published in press, condemning Shostakovich's opera. Partially because the film now had no score, work on it was stopped and it was never completed.

Nevertheless, Tsekhanovsky compiled the four finished parts (around 40 minutes) and the rest of material into a full movie. Although the film was nearly finished, it was put into storage at the Lenfilm archives, where almost all of it was lost in a fire caused by the 1941 bombings of Leningrad that hit Lenfilm. Vera Tsekhanovskaya managed to save only the 4-minute Marketplace scene, and it stands alone as a classic of Russian animation. Mikhail Tsekhanovsky described the fate of his dream film as "a catastrophe".

Music
Shostakovich considered his score for the film to be one of his best works. As he wrote, "There are a number of pieces I'm happy with. Especially Balda — from start to finish". After Shostakovich died, his widow arranged to have the score completed by one of Shostakovich's students, . The world premiere recording of the 50-minute work was made by the Russian Philharmonic Orchestra conducted by Thomas Sanderling and released in 2006, a century after Shostakovich's birth.

The score was published in 2005, in volume 126 of DSCH Publishers' New Collected Works of Dmitri Shostakovich. This publication contains text in Russian and English.

Surviving and restored parts (DSCH, 2005)
A number of items were found either in the original composer's handwriting or that of a copier's; eleven others were found only in rough draft form with missing parts or harmonies, and were restored by Vadim Bibergan.

Instrumentation

Winds
Note: "1+" means that two instruments are specified, but only one part is written for them both to play.

Strings
Note: the exact number of violin/viola/cello/contrabass players is not indicated, except in pieces where only one instrument is to play.

1The violin, viola, cello and contrabass parts are only present for one loud chord at the end of the piece.

Keyboards and tuned percussion

Other percussion
Names in italics are in their original Italian.

Voices
Note: the exact number of choralists is mostly not indicated; "2+" means that there are at least two harmonic lines somewhere in a part, or at least 2 voices are specifically called for.

References

External links 
«The Tale of the Priest and of His Workman Balda» at animator.ru
Liner notes  by Manashir Yakubov for the recording of The Tale of the Priest and his Worker, Balda by the Russian Philharmonic Orchestra, Thomas Sanderling conductor (Deutsche Grammophon B0006507-02)
Surviving portion of the film on Vimeo with English subtitles (public domain)

1936 animated films
1930s unfinished films
Soviet animated films
Lost animated films
Films based on works by Aleksandr Pushkin
Films based on poems
Films based on fairy tales
Films scored by Dmitri Shostakovich
1936 films
Lost Russian films
Soviet black-and-white films
Russian black-and-white films
Lost Soviet films